Questions: Philosophy for Young People is a peer-reviewed academic journal sponsored by the American Philosophical Association, the Northwest Center for Philosophy for Children, and York College of Pennsylvania. It publishes short articles, discussions, drawings, and other writings by school students interested in philosophical issues. Questions is published in an easy to read format to make it accessible to students of all ages, though it is also intended for teachers and parents who want to introduce philosophy to children. The journal is published by the Philosophy Documentation Center. Members of the American Association of Philosophy Teachers have online access to this journal as a benefit of membership.

History 
The editor-in-chief of the first 5 issues of Questions (2001–2005) was Jana Mohr Lone. Rory Kraft and Allison Reiheld co-edited the following 3 issues; Kraft continued to edit the journal from 2008-forward. The 2006 issue was funded in part by Michigan State University, at the time the home of both Kraft and Reiheld.

Abstracting and indexing 
The journal is abstracted and indexed by Academic Outline, Google Scholar, InfoTrac, Philosophy Research Index, and PhilPapers.

See also 
 List of philosophy journals

External links 
 
 Northwest Center for Philosophy for Children

References

Annual journals
English-language journals
Philosophy journals
Publications established in 2001
Philosophy Documentation Center academic journals